Canford Cliffs is a ward of Poole, Dorset. Since 2019, the ward has elected 2 councillors to Bournemouth, Christchurch and Poole Council.

History 
The ward was formerly used for elections to Poole Borough Council, which it elected three councillors.

Geography 
The ward covers the Canford Cliffs and Sandbanks areas of Poole. It is divided between the Bournemouth West, Mid Dorset and North Poole, and Poole constituencies for General Elections.

Councillors

Election results

2019

2015

2011

2007

References 

Wards of Bournemouth, Christchurch and Poole